Discopsis is a genus of small sea snails, marine gastropod mollusks in the family Tornidae.

Taxonomy
Rolán & Rubio (2002: 46) hold Discopsis as a valid genus, distinct from Cochliolepis Stimpson, 1858, on the grounds that the latter belongs in the family Vitrinellidae and the former in Tornidae. This should be reevaluated in the perspective that both families are considered synonyms. Adam & Knudsen (1969) may have been right in placing the West African species in Cochliolepis.

Species
Species within the genus Discopsis include:
 Discopsis aperta Rolán & Rubio, 2002
 † Discopsis canui (de Morgan, 1920) 
 Discopsis costulata de Folin, 1870
 Discopsis dautzenbergi (Adam & Knudsen, 1969)
 Discopsis deprellus (Strong, 1938)
 † Discopsis europaea (de Stefani, 1888) 
 Discopsis exmilitaris Rolán & Rubio, 2002
 † Discopsis falunica (de Morgan, 1920) 
 Discopsis ferreirorum Rolán & Rubio, 2002
 Discopsis gruveli (Dautzenberg, 1912)
 Discopsis irregularis Rolán & Rubio, 2002
 Discopsis jullieni (Adam & Knudsen, 1969)
 Discopsis liliae Rolán & Rubio, 2002
 Discopsis militaris (Jousseaume, 1872)
 Discopsis nodulosa Rolán & Rubio, 2002
 Discopsis omalos (de Folin, 1870)
 † Discopsis pontileviensis (de Morgan, 1920) 
 † Discopsis pseudocanui Landau, Ceulemans & Van Dingenen, 2018 
 † Discopsis pseudotinostoma (Boettger, 1907) 
 Discopsis radians (Rolán & Rubio, 1990)
 Discopsis rara Rolán & Rubio, 2002
 Discopsis reducta (Rolán & Rubio, 1990)
 Discopsis similis Rolán & Rubio, 2002
 † Discopsis trigonostoma (Basterot, 1825) 
 Species brought into synonymy
 Discopsis africana Bartsch, 1915 : synonym of Cochliolepis planulata (G.B. Sowerby III, 1892)
 Discopsis alfredensis Bartsch, 1915: synonym of Macromphalina alfredensis (Bartsch, 1915)
 Discopsis apertus Rolán & Rubio, 2002 : synonym of Discopsis aperta Rolán & Rubio, 2002 (wrong gender agreement of specific epithet)
 Discopsis costulatus de Folin, 1870 : synonym of Discopsis costulata de Folin, 1870 (wrong gender agreement of specific epithet)
 Discopsis exmilitare Rolán & Rubio, 2002 : synonym of Discopsis exmilitaris Rolán & Rubio, 2002 (wrong gender agreement of specific epithet)
 Discopsis niasensis Thiele, 1925: synonym of Anticlimax niasensis (Thiele, 1925)
 Discopsis nodulosus Rolán & Rubio, 2002 : synonym of Discopsis nodulosa Rolán & Rubio, 2002 (wrong gender agreement of specific epithet)
 Discopsis padangensis Thiele, 1925: synonym of Anticlimax padangensis (Thiele, 1925)
 Discopsis rarus Rolán & Rubio, 2002 : synonym of Discopsis rara Rolán & Rubio, 2002 (wrong gender agreement of specific epithet)
 Discopsis turtoni Bartsch, 1915 : synonym of Cochliolepis turtoni (Bartsch, 1915) (original combination)

References

 Dautzenberg P., 1912 Mission Gruvel sur la côte occidentale d'Afrique (1909-1910): Mollusques marins. Annales de l'Institut Océanographique, Paris, (Nouvelle Série) 5(3) : 1-111, pl. 1-3.
 Gofas, S.; Le Renard, J.; Bouchet, P. (2001). Mollusca, in: Costello, M.J. et al. (Ed.) (2001). European register of marine species: a check-list of the marine species in Europe and a bibliography of guides to their identification. Collection Patrimoines Naturels, 50: pp. 180–213

External links
 To World Register of Marine Species

 
Tornidae
Gastropod genera